Ada Prins (18 September 1879, Amsterdam – 20 July 1977, Voorburg) was a Dutch chemist and in 1908 became the first woman in the Netherlands to earn a Ph.D. in chemistry.

Biography 
Prins obtained her doctorate at the University of Amsterdam under the supervision of Richard Roland Holst with the thesis Vloeiende mengkristallen in binaire stelsels (Liquid mixed crystals in binary systems). 

She went on to enhance her reputation by writing chemistry textbooks. Together with the engineer Grada P. de Groot she wrote Guidelines for inorganic and organic chemistry with its application in industry and household. In 1935 the second edition was published by Nijgh & van Ditmar NV Rotterdam. She also wrote the Brief Guidelines for Qualitative Chemical Analysis, published by Scheltema & Holkema's Boekhandel and Uitgeverers-mij NV - Amsterdam. In 1952 the last and seventh improved edition was published.

Personal life 

Prins was known to have had a friendly intellectual and romantic relationship with Dutch poet and socialist, Herman Gorter (1864–1927) starting in 1901. According to Zwart,Whereas Ada Prins is mostly remembered as one of Gorter’s secret lovers, she was first and foremost his educated guide into the complex and enigmatic world of twentieth-century chemistry research. Liquid crystal chemistry became an important source of inspiration for Gorter’s work and the main objective of this paper is to demonstrate her influence on Gorter’s Pan as a scientific poem.Her brother was the shipbuilder and engineer Huibert Nicolaas Prins. At his funeral in 1939 she spoke on behalf of the family.

Selected works 

 Prins, Ada. "Flüssige Mischkristalle in binären Systemen." Zeitschrift für physikalische Chemie 67.1 (1909): 689-723.
 Prins, A. "Critical phenomena of the ternary system ether anthraquinone-naphthalene." KNAW, Proceedings. Vol. 13. 1910.
 Büchner, Ε. H., and Ada Prins. "Löslichkeit und Lösungswärme von Chromtrioxyd in Wasser." Zeitschrift für Physikalische Chemie 81.1 (1913): 113-120.
 Prins, A. "On critical end-points and the systems ethane ." KNAW, Proceedings. Vol. 17. 1915.
 Büchner, E. H., and A. Prins. "Vapour pressures in the system: carbon disulphide-methylalcohol." KNAW, Proceedings. Vol. 19. 1917.
 Prins, Ada, and Grada P. de Groot. Leidraad voor de anorganische en organische scheikunde met toepassingen in industrie en huishouding. Nijgh & van Ditmar, 1927.
 Prins, Ada. "Sur la Difficulté D'obtenir une Idée du Mécanisme D'une Réaction par la Détermination de la Vitesse." Recueil des Travaux Chimiques des Pays‐Bas 51.6 (1932): 576-578.

References

20th-century Dutch chemists
Dutch women chemists
Scientists from Amsterdam
University of Amsterdam alumni
1879 births
1977 deaths